Samaké is a Malian surname that may refer to
Abdoulaye Samaké (born 1987), Malian football goalkeeper
Issaka Samaké (born 1994), Malian football defender
Lassana Samaké (born 1992), Malian football midfielder 
Soumaila Samake (born 1978), Malian basketball player 
Yaya Samaké (born 1987), Malian football midfielder 
Yeah Samake (born 1969), Malian entrepreneur and politician